Brush Fork is a census-designated place (CDP) in Mercer County, West Virginia, United States. As of the 2010 census, its population was 1,197.

The community takes its name from nearby Brush Fork creek.

References

Census-designated places in Mercer County, West Virginia
Census-designated places in West Virginia